The Themba Development Project, founded in 2008, is a Canadian registered Non-Profit Organization (NGO) which works in a variety of communities in South Africa. The core programs of the organization are targeted at improving basic living conditions for the poorest residents of South Africa.

South African programs include:

Fruit and Nut Bearing Tree Planting to improve available food stocks as well as to protect topsoil from environmental degradation
Community gardening program which provides vegetable gardening plots and seeds to families facing food insecurity
Distribution of School uniforms and supplies to families unable to afford basic education
Youth Leadership Football Program targeted at-risk youth in the community
Environmental Awareness Program to teach respect for the environment
Emergency Housing Program which replaces unsafe shacks with basic houses

History
The Themba Development Project was founded in 2008 when its founder, Catherine Robar viewed the substandard living conditions of the people living in Thembalethu, an informal settlement near the city of George in the Western Cape Province. Thembalethu means “Place of Hope” in the Xhosa language and is the current home to the organization's co-founder Gcinisizwe Noyakaza, a member of the Xhosa tribe. The organization is directed by a Canadian Board of Directors however programs are created with the input of the communities in which the development work is targeted. In addition to food insecurity, Thembalethu was named in 2010 as having the highest unemployment rate in South Africa with approximately 80% of its residents unable to find work.

In 2010 the organization expanded its programs to include the former Transkei region of South Africa, birth region of former president Nelson Mandela. The Themba Development Project began work in Nqiningana, a tiny village near Lady Frere and Queenstown in the Eastern Cape Province. Nqiningana struggles with a severe lack of rainfall, high unemployment, HIV and Tuberculosis.

Awards and recognition
Although the organization started very modestly, it has received significant media attention due to the many humanitarian award nominations received by its Founding Director, Catherine Robar. These nominations include:

2009 nominee for the Canadian National Me To We Humanitarian Award hosted by Canadian Living Magazine, CTV News and Free The Children
2010 nominee for the North American Care2 and Tom's of Maine Hero's Next Door Humanitarian Award http://www.care2.com/hero-next-door/214/description
2010 Top 50 finalist in the CBC Champions For Change Award hosted by the Canadian Broadcasting Corporation http://www.cbc.ca/change/2010/10/catherine-robar.html
2010 Winner of the Big Brothers/Big Sisters Community Mentor Award http://www.bigbrothersbigsistershalifax.ca/en/home/events/catherinerobar.aspx
2011 Semi-Finalist in the 2011 South African Feather Awards, category: Community Builder-Humanitarian

References

Development charities based in Canada
Organizations established in 2008
Foreign charities operating in South Africa